Ruhullah, also spelled Rouhollah, Ruhollah or Rohullah and in other ways ( or  or ), is a male Muslim given name composed of the elements Ruh and Allah. It means spirit of God. It may refer to:

Given Name
 Rohullah (Bagram detainee) (born 1967), an Afghan Bagram detainee
 Rouhollah Arab (born 1984), an Iranian football player
 Rouhollah Askari (born 1982), an Iranian sprinter
 Rouhollah Ataei (born 1983), an Iranian football player
 Ruhollah Bigdeli (born 1986), an Iranian football player
 Rouhollah Dadashi (1982-2011), an Iranian powerlifter, bodybuilder and strongman
 Ruhollah Hosseinian (born 1955), an Iranian politician
 Ruhollah Khaleqi (1906–1965), an Iranian musician, composer, conductor and author
 Ruhollah Khatami (ca. 1903-1988), an Iranian shia Cleric
 Ruhollah Khomeini (1902–1989), an Iranian religious leader and politician, leader of the Islamic Revolution
, Iranian Politician
, Iranian Politician
, Iranian Politician 
, Iranian Politician
, Iranian Politician
 (born 1983) Iranian Shia Cleric
 Rohullah Nikpai (born 1987), an Afghan taekwondo practitioner
 Rouhollah Samieinia (born 1979), an Iranian football player
 Rouhollah Seifollahi, an Iranian Football player
 Ruhollah Zam, an Iranian journalist

Surname
 Sahib Rohullah Wakil (born 1962), an Afghan held in Guantanamo Bay detention camp
 Aziz Rohallah (born 1980), an Afghan football player

Arabic masculine given names
Iranian masculine given names